The 1955 LSU Tigers football team represented Louisiana State University during the 1955 college football season.  Under head coach Paul Dietzel, the Tigers had a record of 3–5–2 with an SEC record of 2–3–1. It was Dietzel's first season as head coach at LSU.

Schedule

References

LSU
LSU Tigers football seasons
LSU Tigers football